Lita Tresierra (1977 – 21 June 2010) was a Costa Rican singer and actress. She was the singer of the alternative rock musical group La Nueva P (1994–1997), which released the album Simple, with songs like "La pecera es una loquera", "No", and "Bip biri bop". The band got dissolved when she left the country, but they gathered in 2009.

She appeared in False Pretenses (2004) and Dr. Jekyll & Mr. Hyde (2008), on TV she appeared in Naked Josh, Durham Country and Stephen King's Dead Zone, and in videogames she played Rosa in Assassin's Creed II.

She died on 21 June 2010 from a car accident at the age of 32 after being two days in a coma. Ubisoft decided to retire the character Rosa from the Assassin's Creed series.

Filmography
 The Factory (2012) as Divine
 The Girl in the White Coat (2011) as Cindy
 Assassin's Creed II (2009) as Rosa
 Durham County (2009) as Dr. Deena Alexie
 Dr. Jekyll & Mr. Hyde (2008) as Nurse
 The Dead Zone (2007) as Maria Toro
 Lethal Obsession (2007) as Mary Cummins
 The Ecstasy Note (2006) as Nereida
 Blue Line (2005) as Girlfriend
 Naked Josh (2005) as Hotel Waitress
 Act of War: Direct Action (2005) as Lieutenant Vega
 False Pretenses (2004) as Teenage Girl Waitress

References

External links
 

1977 births
2010 deaths
Costa Rican women singers
Costa Rican television actresses
Costa Rican film actresses
Assassin's Creed
Road incident deaths in Canada